Spermidine is a polyamine compound found in ribosomes and living tissues and having various metabolic functions within organisms. It was originally isolated from semen.

Function
Spermidine is an aliphatic polyamine. Spermidine synthase (SPDS) catalyzes its formation from putrescine. It is a precursor to other polyamines, such as spermine and its structural isomer thermospermine.

Spermidine synchronizes an array of biological processes, (such as Ca2+, Na+, K+ -ATPase) thus maintaining membrane potential and controlling intracellular pH and volume. Spermidine regulates biological processes, such as Ca2+ influx by glutamatergic N-methyl-d-aspartate receptor (NMDA receptor), which has been associated with nitric oxide synthase (NOS) and cGMP/PKG pathway activation and a decrease of Na+,K+-ATPase activity in cerebral cortex synaptosomes.

Spermidine is a longevity agent in mammals due to various mechanisms of action, which are just beginning to be understood. Autophagy is the main mechanism at the molecular level, but evidence has been found for other mechanisms, including inflammation reduction, lipid metabolism, and regulation of cell growth, proliferation, and death.

Spermidine is known to regulate plant growth, assisting the in vitro process of transcribing RNA, and inhibition of NOS. Also, spermidine is a precursor to other polyamines, such as spermine and thermospermine, some of which contribute to tolerance against drought and salinity in plants.

Spermidine has been tested and discovered to encourage hair shaft elongation and lengthen hair growth. Spermidine has also been found to “upregulate expression of the epithelial stem cell-associated keratins K15 and K19, and dose-dependently modulated K15 promoter activity in situ and the colony forming efficiency, proliferation and K15 expression of isolated human K15-GFP+ cells in vitro.”

Biochemical actions
Spermidine's known actions include:
 Inhibits neuronal nitric oxide synthase (nNOS)
 Binds and precipitates DNA
 Polyamine plant growth regulator

Sources
Good dietary sources of spermidine are aged cheese, mushrooms, soy products, legumes, corn, and whole grains. Spermidine is plentiful in a Mediterranean diet.
For comparison: The spermidine content in human seminal plasma varies between approx. 15 and 50 mg/L (mean 31 mg/L).

 Note - spermidine content varies by source and age. See ref for details.

In grains, the endosperm contains most of the spermidine. One of the best known grain dietary sources is wheat germ, containing as much as 243 mg/kg.

Uses
 Spermidine can be used in electroporation while transferring the DNA into the cell under the electrical impulse. May be used for purification of DNA-binding proteins.
 Spermidine is also used, along with calcium chloride, for precipitating DNA onto microprojectiles for bombardment with a gene gun.
 Spermidine has also been reported to protect the heart from aging and prolong the lifespan of mice, while in humans it was correlated with lower blood pressure. It also was found to reduce the amount of aging in yeast, flies, worms, and human immune cells by inducing autophagy.
 Spermidine may play a role in male and female fertility. Fertile men have higher spermidine levels than men who are infertile, and spermidine supplementation has been shown to help maintain a healthy hormone balance and reduce oxidative stress.
 Spermidine is commonly used for in vitro molecular biology reactions, particularly, in vitro transcription by phage RNA polymerases, in vitro transcription by human RNA polymerase II, and in vitro translation.
Spermidine increases specificity and reproducibility of Taq-mediated PCR by neutralizing and stabilizing the negative charge on DNA phosphate backbone.
 Spermidine is, at physiological pH, a polycationic reagent that aids in enzyme digestion by forcing apart DNA molecules.

See also
 Norspermidine
 Spermine
 Putrescine

References

External links
 Safety Data Sheet

NMDA receptor agonists
Secondary amines
Polyamines